The European Conference on Wireless Sensor Networks (EWSN) is an annual academic conference on wireless sensor networks.

Although there is no official ranking of academic conferences on wireless sensor networks, EWSN is widely regarded as the top European event in sensor networks.

EWSN Events 
EWSN started in year 2004:
 EWSN 2015, Porto, Portugal, February 9–11, 2015
 EWSN 2014, Oxford, UK, February 17–19, 2014
 EWSN 2013, Ghent, Belgium, February 13–15, 2013
 EWSN 2012, Trento, Italy, February 15–17, 2012
 EWSN 2011, Bonn, Germany, February 23.25, 2011
 EWSN 2010, Coimbra, Portugal, February 17–19, 2010
 EWSN 2009, Cork, Ireland, February 11–13, 2009
 EWSN 2008, Bologna, Italy, January 30–31, February 1, 2008
 EWSN 2007, Delft, The Netherlands, January 29–31, 2007
 EWSN 2006, Zurich, Switzerland, February 13–15, 2006
 EWSN 2005, Istanbul, Turkey, January 31 - February 2, 2005
 EWSN 2004, Berlin, Germany, January 19–21, 2004

History 
EWSN started in year 2004 and the prime motivation behind EWSN was to provide the European researchers working in sensor networks a venue to disseminate their research results. However, over the years EWSN has grown into a truly International event with participants and authors coming from all over the world.  In 2006 it was decided to silently upgrade the event from a workshop to a conference. With this change in effect the acronym (i.e. EWSN) remains the same.  Therefore, when giving a reference to EWSN 2004 to 2006 use European Workshop on Wireless Sensor Networks, and when giving a reference to EWSN 2007 onwards use European Conference on Wireless Sensor Networks.

See also
 Wireless sensor network

External links 
 
 EWSN Bibliography (from DBLP)

Wireless sensor network
Computer networking conferences